Kathleen Aerts (born 18 June 1978 in Geel, Belgium) is a Belgian singer, actress and host. She was a member of the successful girl group K3.

Early life
Aerts was born in Geel, Belgium, on 18 June 1978. She has been involved in singing and music since a young age. Between 1992 and 1995 she gained experience as a member of the group Wonderful Game and became known for her two participations in the Flemish version of the Soundmixshow: in 1995 she came third with the song Grow A Baby by the Belgian pop group  and in 1997 she made it to the semifinals with Chirpy chirpy cheep cheep by Middle of the Road.

Career
From 1998 to 2009 Aerts was a member of the successful girl group K3. Originally thought as the Flemish version of the Spice Girls, the group eventually became famous for their songs for children. Because K3 was originally envisioned as the Flemish version of the Spice Girls, the group was made up of all females in their twenties: Aerts, Karen Damen, and Kristel Verbeke.

K3 achieved success after the release of "Heyah Mama", and in 2002 their manager sold the band to Studio 100. The production company made the group an even bigger success, with merchandising, film, TV series and books also being released.

In 2009 Aerts decided to stop being a member of K3 and to start her solo career. Her first song, titled "Zumba Yade", was made in cooperation with Unicef. The single reached the top 3 of the Dutch Single Top 100 in July 2009 and the top 20 of the Ultratop 50 in Flanders. She sold more than 10,000 CDs in Belgium and the Netherlands. In November 2009, Aerts released her debut solo album Kathleen in symfonie. The album contained twelve songs, including a duet with Danny de Munk. Aerts ensured that part of the proceedings from the album went to Unicef. This decision ensued from her experience in South Africa.

The same year she also decided to go back to children's music, releasing a song titled "Boerderij blues" (en. Farm blues). She released three other songs for children. In 2007 a wax figure of Kathleen Aerts was unveiled in the Madame Tussauds in Amsterdam together with those of the other two original K3 members.

In 2016, Aerts released "Die roos", an adaptation of Ann Christy's hit "De roos", her first single in Afrikaans. A year later she recorded the single "Afrika", also in Afrikaans, which was also part of the soundtrack of the film F.C. De Kampioenen 3: Forever (2007). In September 2017, she published her third book: Lilly en Max in de wereld van oma.

In 2020, Aerts participated as Mermaid in the television show The Masked Singer, in which judges must guess the identity of the masked participant. Here she was reunited after a long time with Karen Damen, who sat on the jury of the program and correctly guessed the masked mermaid was Aerts.

Personal life
Kathleen Aerts married Steven van Hoof, a police officer, in 2010. Their first child, a boy, was born on 26 January 2011. Their second boy was born in December 2013. In 2015, she moved with her husband, sons and mother to Paarl, South Africa.

Books
 2009: Mijn leven als K1 (Author: Kathleen Aerts, published by Kwagga in Dutch)
 2015: Voor altijd mijn mama. Leven met jongdementie (Author: Kathleen Aerts, published by Lannoo in Dutch)
 2017: Lilly en Max in de wereld van Oma (Author: Kathleen Aerts, published by Lannoo in Dutch)

Musicals
 1998: Sneeuwwitje (as Sneeuwwitje, en. "Snow White")
 2002: Doornroosje (as one of the good "fairies", en. Sleeping Beauty)
 2003: De drie biggetjes (as Knorri, one of the "Three little pigs")
 2005: De kleine zeemeermin (as The "Little Mermaid")
 2007: De drie biggetjes (as Knorri, one of the "Three little pigs")

Films

Discography

Singles

Albums

References

Sources
 Chart Stats: K3, Ultratop (in Dutch)
 Chart Stats: K3, Dutch Charts (in Dutch)
 Kathleen Aerts gelukkiger dan ooit nu ze K3 heeft verlaten, Het Nieuwsblad (in Dutch)
 Ex-K3 Kathleen trouwt, Gazet van Antwerpen (in Dutch)
 AMSTERDAM - Voormalig K3-zangeres Kathleen Aerts wil voor kinderen blijven zingen. "Dat K3-verleden wis je niet zomaar uit. Afgelopen zomer heb ik veel opgetreden en het was duidelijk dat kinderen mij nog steeds in hun hart sluiten.", NU.nl (in Dutch)

Living people
1978 births
Belgian pop singers
Belgian film actresses
K3 (band) members
21st-century Belgian singers